Lumsdaine is a surname. Notable people with the surname include:

Arthur A. Lumsdaine (1913–1989), American applied psychologist
David Lumsdaine (born 1931), Australian composer
Leon Lumsdaine (1923–1966), British modern pentathlete
Jack Lumsdaine (1895–1948), Australian singer and songwriter